Jar is the debut studio album by American rock band Superheaven, released on April 30, 2013. It was originally released under the band's prior name, Daylight, which has since been changed due to a legal dispute. The album peaked at no. 184 on the Billboard 200.

On January 10, 2023, Superheaven announced that they would go on a small tour of the East and West Coasts in honor of the album's 10th anniversary.

Background and recording
Superheaven formed in 2008 under the name of Daylight. The group released its debut EP Sinking in 2009 through Get This Right Records. The band's second EP, Dispirit, was released in 2010 through Six Feet Under Records. The band would release a third EP, The Difference in Good and Bad Dreams, in 2012 through Run for Cover Records. Later that year, drummer John Bowes left the band was replaced by Zack Robbins.

The band would record its debut album, Jar, with producer Will Yip in December 2012. 

A music video for the song "In On It" was released on March 21, 2013. A music video was released for "Life In a Jar" on April 30, the same day the album was released. The album's third video, "No One's Deserving", was released on November 21.

Track listing

Personnel
Superheaven
 Taylor Madison – guitar, vocals
 Jake Clarke – guitar, vocals
 Joe Kane – bass
 Zack Robbins – drums, backing vocals

Additional personnel
 Will Yip – production, engineer, mixing, mastering, additional percussion
 Shelly Weiss – strings
 Vince Ratti – mixing
 Jay Preston – studio assistant

Charts

References

Run for Cover Records albums
Superheaven albums
2013 debut albums
2013 albums
Albums produced by Will Yip